The 1918 United States Senate election in Montana took place on November 5, 1918. Incumbent United States Senator Thomas J. Walsh, who was first elected to the Senate in 1912, ran for re-election. He won the Democratic primary uncontested, and was opposed in the general election by Oscar M. Lanstrum, a former State Representative and the Republican nominee, and Jeannette Rankin, one of two United States representatives from Montana's at-large congressional district and the nominee of the National Party. Walsh narrowly won his second term in the Senate.

Democratic primary

Candidates
Thomas J. Walsh, incumbent United States Senator

Results

Republican primary

Candidates
Oscar M. Lanstrum, former State Representative
Jeannette Rankin, one of two Congressional representatives from Montana's at-large congressional district
Harry H. Parsons, attorney
Edmund Nichols

Results

General election

Results

References

Montana
1918
1918 Montana elections